Sant Aniol (Catalan for Saint Andeolus) may refer to:

Sant Aniol d'Aguja, Benedictine monastery in Montagut i Oix, Province of Girona, Catalonia, Spain
Sant Aniol de Finestres, municipality in the comarca of Garrotxa in Girona, Catalonia, Spain